Great Kelk is a village in the East Riding of Yorkshire, England. It forms part of the civil parish of Kelk.

In 1823 Great Kelk inhabitants numbered 158. Occupations included eight farmers, a gardener, a shoemaker, and the landlord of the Board public house.

References

External links

Villages in the East Riding of Yorkshire